Tajoldinabad (also Romanized as Tājoldīnābād; also known as Tāj ol Dīn and Tāchīnābād) is a village in Oshnavieh-ye Shomali Rural District, in the Central District of Oshnavieh County, West Azerbaijan Province, Iran. At the 2006 census, its population was 873, in 173 families.

References 

Populated places in Oshnavieh County